Early Underground is a compilation album by American electronica musician Moby. It was released in March 1993 by Instinct Records. The album consists of tracks previously released by Moby under other pseudonyms such as Barracuda, Brainstorm, UHF, and Voodoo Child. A similar compilation, Instinct Dance, was released two years earlier by Instinct.

Track listing

Sample credits
 "Permanent Green" contains a sample of "On The Floor" performed by Michael Jackson

Personnel 
Credits for Early Underground adapted from album liner notes.

 Moby – arrangement, production, writing

Artwork and design
 Stephanie Mauer – art direction
 Jill Greenberg – photography

References

External links
 
 

1993 compilation albums
Moby compilation albums
Albums produced by Moby
Instinct Records compilation albums